The Mission City Outlaws are a junior "B" ice hockey team based in Mission, British Columbia, Canada. They are members of the Harold Brittain Conference of the Pacific Junior Hockey League (PJHL). The Outlaws play their home games at Mission Leisure Centre. Scott Farrell is the current general manager and co-owner of the hockey team.  Parv Dhaliwal is also a co-owner.

History

The Hope Icebreakers joined the league in 2003 as an expansion team, before relocating prior to the 2008-09 PIJHL season to become the Mission Icebreakers. For the 2012-13 season the team changed their name and logo to the Mission City Outlaws.

In 2014-15 season, the Mission City Outlaws beat out the Aldergrove Kodiaks to win the Harold Brittain Conference.
Hosts of the 2014-15 Cyclone Taylor Cup - The Mission City Outlaws beat out the North Vancouver Wolfpack to claim the Bronze Medal.

Season-by-season record

Note: GP = Games played, W = Wins, L = Losses, T = Ties, OTL = Overtime Losses, Pts = Points, GF = Goals for, GA = Goals against

Cyclone Taylor Cup
British Columbia Jr B Provincial Championships

 2015 Host for Cup

External links
Official website of the Mission City Outlaws

Pacific Junior Hockey League teams
Ice hockey teams in British Columbia
Mission, British Columbia
2003 establishments in British Columbia
Ice hockey clubs established in 2003